Peder Kongshaug (born 13 August 2001) is a Norwegian speed skater. He is a 2022 Olympic champion in team pursuit.

Biography
Kongshaug is the son of Peer Albert Kongshaug, who represented Norway in sailing and placed eighth at the 1988 Flying Dutchman World Championship in Medemblik, Netherlands.

At the 2020 World Junior Speed Skating Championships in February 2020, Kongshaug won the gold medal in the 1000m event. He took part in the 2021 European Speed Skating Championships in Heerenveen where he sixth place in the 500m and also finished in the 10th and 19th place in the 1000m and 5000m events respectively. At the World Single Distances Speed Skating Championships in 2021, he finished 14th in the 1000m, 18th in the 5000m and was not selected for the team pursuit.

At the 2022 European Speed Skating Championships, Kongshaug finished 7th place in the 1500m and 17th place in the mass-start. Having qualified for the 2022 Winter Olympics, which took place in February 2022, where in the 1500m event, he finished 1.18 s behind the Dutch champion Kjeld Nuis, having competed in the tenth race against the silver medalist Thomas Krol. With Kongshaug's teammates Hallgeir Engebråten and Sverre Lunde Pedersen, the Norwegian relay obtained the best qualifying time then won in the semi-final against the Dutch and then against the Russians in the final, the latter having nevertheless established a new Olympic record in their duel against the Americans.

Personal records

He is currently in 21st position in the adelskalender with 147.111 points.

References

External links
 
 
 

2001 births
Living people
Norwegian male speed skaters
Speed skaters at the 2022 Winter Olympics
Olympic speed skaters of Norway
Medalists at the 2022 Winter Olympics
Olympic gold medalists for Norway
Olympic medalists in speed skating
21st-century Norwegian people
World Single Distances Speed Skating Championships medalists